Die Laughing is the fourth stand-up comedy album by Doug Stanhope, released in 2002 by Stand Up! Records.

Track listing
"Stillborn Liver" - 2:05
"DUI/MADD" - 5:03
"Drugs Are for Kids" - 1:30
"Second Hand Bullshit" - 3:52
"Hair in My Food" - 1:41
"Get Off the Field, You Suck!" - 3:16
"School Shootings" - 5:35
"Cowards" - 3:56
"Ants" - 1:25
"Wisdom" - 2:19
"President Doug" - 3:23
"Fuck You God" - 4:48
"Try Sodomy!" - 6:49
"Pro Abortion" - 1:45
"Lucky in Love" - 2:41
"Stuff I Should Have Edited Out But Didn't" - 1:54
"Eeewwww!" - 3:27
"The Upside of Sexual abuse" - 0:49
"To Tell You the Truth" - 3:46
"Potty Mouth" - 1:08
"The Beautiful People" - 4:42

Personnel 

John Machnik – Remastering
Dan Schlissel – Editing
Mike Sommerfeldt – Editing, Remastering

References

External links
 Doug Stanhope's official website
 Doug Stanhope's MySpace Page
 Stand Up! Records

Doug Stanhope albums
2002 albums
Stand Up! Records live albums
2000s comedy albums